Upfront is the sixteenth album recorded by jazz musician David Sanborn, released in 1992. This album focused on other soloists, instead of Sanborn’s alto saxophone being the primary instrument. Some key musicians on this album include guitarists Eric Clapton, Cornell Dupree and Hiram Bullock, tenor saxophonist  John Purcell, bassist/keyboardist Marcus Miller, percussionist Don Alias and drummer Steve Jordan.

Track listing

Personnel 
 David Sanborn – alto saxophone, soprano saxophone (1, 8)
 Marcus Miller – keyboards (1-4, 6, 8), lead guitar (1), bass guitar, bass clarinet (1, 3, 4, 6, 8), horn arrangements (2, 3, 4, 6), acoustic guitar (8), arrangements (8)
 Ricky Peterson – Hammond B3 organ (1-4, 6, 8, 9), acoustic piano (7)
 Jason Miller – synthesizer sound programming (1, 2, 3, 6, 8)
 Richard Tee – Hammond B3 organ (5)
 William "Spaceman" Patterson – rhythm guitar (1, 3, 4), wah-wah guitar (6), guitars (7, 8, 9)
 Chris Bruce – lead guitar (3), rhythm guitar (4), guitar fills (4)
 Hiram Bullock – additional guitar (3)
 Eric Clapton – guitar solo (4)
 Cornell Dupree – guitars (5)
 Steve Jordan – drums (1-6, 8, 9), rhythm guitar (6), timbales (7)
 Don Alias – percussion (1, 3, 6, 7, 8), congas (4)
 Naná Vasconcelos – additional percussion (8)
 John Purcell – saxello (1, 8), alto flute (2), tenor saxophone (3, 4, 6)
 Lenny Pickett – horn arrangements (3), tenor saxophone (7)
 Crispin Cioe – baritone saxophone (5)
 Arno Hecht – tenor saxophone (5)
 Stan Harrison – alto saxophone (7)
 Dave Bargeron – trombone (2, 4, 6, 7), tuba (2)
 Bob Funk – trombone (5)
 Art Baron – trombone (7)
 Randy Brecker – trumpet (3, 4, 6)
 "Hollywood" Paul Litteral – trumpet (5)
 Laurie Frink – trumpet (7)
 Earl Gardner – trumpet (7)
 Herb Robertson – trumpet (9)
 Uptown Horns – horn arrangements (5)

Vocals on "Bang Bang"
 Chris Albert 
 Don Alias
 Becky Anderson 
 Susan Brown-Silag
 Barry Campbell
 Manny Castillo 
 Robin Downes
 Steve Ferrone
 Ava Gardner
 Bibi Green 
 Steve Jordan
 Tommy LiPuma 
 Marcus Miller
 William "Spaceman" Patterson
 David Sanborn
 Rikke Sanborn
 Michelle Sescher

Production 
 Marcus Miller – producer
 Joe Ferla – recording, mixing 
 Chris Albert – assistant engineer
 Shannon Carr – assistant engineer
 Michael White – assistant engineer
 Bob Ludwig – mastering 
 Artie Smith – drum technician 
 John Purcell – saxophone sound consultant 
 Bibi Green – production coordinator 
 Stephen Byram – artwork, design
 Lynn Goldsmith – cover portrait photography 
 Robert Lewis – photography
 Patrick Rains & Associates – management

Studios
 Recorded at Electric Lady Studios and The Power Station (New York, New York); Camel Studio (New Jersey).
 Mixed at Electric Lady Studios
 Mastered at Masterdisk (New York, New York).

References

External links 
 cduniverse

1992 albums
David Sanborn albums
Albums produced by Marcus Miller